Chandannagar Police Commissionerate (French: Commissariat de police de Chandannagar), established on 30 June 2017, is a police force with primary responsibilities in law enforcement and investigation within certain urban parts of Hooghly district. The Commissionerate is part of the West Bengal Police, and is under the administrative control of Home Ministry of West Bengal. It was formed after bifurcation of the Hooghly Police District, and has nine police stations under its jurisdiction. It was established by Mamata Banerjee, Chief Minister of West Bengal on 30 June 2017.

Police stations
 Bhadreswar
 Rishra
 Serampore
 Chinsurah
 Dankuni
 Uttarpara
 Chandannagar

Women PS
Chinsura Women PS
Serampore Women PS

See also
 Barrackpore Police Commissionerate
 Howrah Police Commissionerate
 Kolkata Police

References

External links

Metropolitan law enforcement agencies of India
Government of Kolkata
West Bengal Police
Police Commissionerate in West Bengal
2017 establishments in West Bengal
Government agencies established in 2017